Shenmu is a county-level city in the north of Shaanxi province, China, bordering Inner Mongolia to the northwest and Shanxi province, across the Yellow River, to the southeast. Under the administration of Yulin City, Shenmu is endowed with plentiful resources, especially coal, such as the three earth sovereigns coal fields of Huojitu, Yujialiang and Shagoupen which makes it the richest county in Shaanxi. Shenmu county is also known for the Shimao archaeological site, the largest Neolithic settlement in China, and a city with evidence of trade networks stretching from the Eurasian Steppe to Southern China.

Etymology

The toponym of city can trace its history back to the Song dynasty. There were three giant pine trees, which were said to be planted since Tang dynasty, close to the fort located at Yangjiacheng. The fort was named Shenmu Zhai ([Fort of Divine Trees]). Then the county administering the area around the fort was established in 1269, and the toponym stuck.

Industrial zones
Shenmu has a large coalfield which should meet future demands for China's power growth.

Administrative divisions
As 2019, Shenmu City is divided to 6 subdistricts and 14 towns.
Subdistricts

Towns

Climate

References

External links
 

County-level divisions of Shaanxi
Yulin, Shaanxi